Rocco Domenico "Rocky" Colavito Jr. (born August 10, 1933) is an American former professional baseball player, coach and television sports commentator. He played in Major League Baseball as an outfielder from 1955 to 1968, most prominently as a member of the Cleveland Indians where, he established himself as a fan favorite for his powerful hitting and his strong throwing arm.

A nine-time All-Star player, Colavito averaged 33 home runs per year for his first 11 seasons, exceeding 40 home runs three times and 100 runs batted in six times. He is the fifth player in the history of the American League (AL) to have eleven consecutive 20 home run seasons (1956–1966). In , he hit four consecutive home runs in one game and, was the AL home run champion. He was also the first outfielder in AL history to complete a season without making an error.

During his tenure in the major leagues, Colavito also played for the Detroit Tigers, Kansas City Athletics, Chicago White Sox, Los Angeles Dodgers, and New York Yankees. At the time of his retirement in 1968, Colavito ranked third among AL right-handed hitters for home runs (371) and eighth for AL games played as a right fielder (1,272).

After his playing career, he worked as a television sports color commentator for WJW (TV) before returning to the playing field to serve as a coach with the Indians and the Kansas City Royals. In 2001, Colavito was voted one of the 100 greatest players in Cleveland Indians' history by a panel of veteran baseball writers, executives and historians. He was inducted into the Cleveland Guardians Hall of Fame in 2006.

Early years
Colavito was born and raised in The Bronx where he became a devoted New York Yankees fan, particularly of Joe DiMaggio. At the age of sixteen, he dropped out of Theodore Roosevelt High School after his sophomore year to play semipro baseball in hopes that it would lead to his dream of playing in Major League Baseball. Major League Baseball rules called for a player to wait until his school class graduated before signing, and only a special appeal allowed him to go pro after a one-year wait. The Yankees expressed little interest in him, and the Philadelphia Athletics had to bow out due to financial problems. The Cleveland Indians did take interest in his strong throwing arm (Indians scout Mike McNally had watched him try out in Yankee Stadium) and signed him at age 17 as an undrafted amateur free agent on January 1, 1951, with two-thirds of his signing bonus deferred until he progressed in their system. In 1954, Colavito hit 38 home runs and accumulated 116 RBIs for the minor league baseball team, Indianapolis Indians.

Cleveland Indians
Colavito made his MLB debut on September 10,  for the Cleveland Indians wearing number 38. In , he started the season playing in the Pacific Coast League, once showing off his throwing arm by hurling a ball over the center-field wall,  from home plate. In July, he returned to the Indians. He finished the season batting .276 with 21 home runs, and was tied for runner-up in the AL Rookie of the Year voting. In , he batted .252 with 25 home runs. In , Colavito, now wearing number 6, batted a career-high .303 with 41 home runs (one behind league leader Mickey Mantle) and 113 runs batted in. He led the AL that season in slugging with a .620 average (the highest by an Indians right-handed hitter until Albert Belle in ), and finished third in the MVP balloting. Colavito also pitched three hitless innings for Cleveland against the Detroit Tigers on August 13 that season.

In , Colavito hit 42 home runs and became the first Indians player to have two consecutive 40-HR seasons; he tied Harmon Killebrew for the AL lead that season (was one short of Al Rosen's club record) and was the AL leader in extra-base hits (66) and total bases (301). In an interview in 2021, Colavito called the game the highlight of his career. He was selected for both of the All-Star Games held for the first time that season and homered in Game 2 (two All-Star games were held annually in 1959 through ). In the AL pennant race that year, the Indians finished second, five games behind the Chicago White Sox. This was the closest he would come to a title until 1967. He also finished fourth in the MVP vote. Colavito would hit 30-plus home runs for seven seasons, establishing himself as a major power hitter. He also was an excellent outfielder with a very strong arm despite being flat-footed.

Detroit Tigers
Colavito was easily the Cleveland fans' favorite, with his handsome appearance and approachability, always accommodating the hundreds of Indians autograph seekers after each game even if it took a few hours. On April 17, Indians general manager Frank Lane unexpectedly traded him to the Detroit Tigers for Harvey Kuenn (the 1959 AL batting champion, having hit .353) just two days before the opening day of the season in Cleveland against the Tigers. The trade proved to be a good one for the Tigers but an unpopular trade for the Indians, whose fans lost their favorite player and best hitter. Kuenn had a minor injury early in the season, he hit .308 for the Indians, but was traded away at the end of the year. Lane, whose reputation as a wheeler-dealer earned him the moniker Frank "Trader" Lane in the sports press, further irritated fans by saying, "What's all the fuss about? All I did was trade hamburger for steak." Tigers general manager Bill DeWitt jokingly responded that he liked hamburger. Colavito (uniform #7) was placed in right field because of his strong throwing arm, moving Al Kaline to center field that season. Colavito hit .249 with 35 home runs and 87 RBI. In , Colavito hit .290 with a career-high 45 home runs, 140 RBI, and 129 runs scored. Detroit led the Major Leagues in scoring, and he placed eighth in the MVP race. Colavito was switched from right field to left field for the Tigers, and Kaline was reestablished in right field. Colavito was selected for both All-Star Games again and homered in Game 2. During one doubleheader that season, he hit 4 home runs, 3 in Game 2.

Tiger fans were happy to get Colavito in Detroit, but did not take to Colavito the same way as Indians fans had in Cleveland, preferring the more consistent Kuenn. Sportswriter Joe Falls, who viewed Colavito as a "self-ordained deity", began going after Colavito in the press and started a feature chronicling the runs he failed to drive in. The Detroit journalist kept a statistic on Colavito during his years playing for the Tigers. When Colavito stranded a runner, Falls would give him an "RNBI" (Run Not Batted In). This infuriated Colavito and created a tense relationship between the two of them for several years. In one game, Falls – acting as the official scorer – charged Colavito with a controversial error, and the "Rock" personally confronted him after the game. Another time when Colavito was in a batting slump and the Tigers fans started razzing him for it, he threw a ball he barely caught in left field over the right-field light tower and roof. On May 12, 1961, Colavito was ejected from a game with the Yankees in New York after climbing into the stands which was against MLB rules (though other Tigers players who followed Colavito into the stands were not ejected), to go after a drunken Yankee fan who had been scuffling with his older father there after the fan started harassing Colavito's wife. The Tigers played the game under protest, which they won 4–3. Colavito ($35,000 in 1961) drew the local fans' criticism by holding out for a higher 1962 salary ($54,000) than established team star Al Kaline ($39,000 to $49,000). In 1962, Colavito had 164 hits (Kaline 121), 37 home runs (Kaline 29), and 112 RBI (Kaline 94). He was selected for both All-Star Games for the third time and homered in Game 2. In 1963, Colavito hit .271, with 22 homers and 91 RBI.

Kansas City A's

Colavito was dealt along with Bob Anderson and $50,000 from the Tigers to the Kansas City Athletics for Jerry Lumpe, Dave Wickersham and Ed Rakow on November 18, . Wearing uniform #7, he spent only one season with Kansas City, earning a $50,000 salary as the highest-paid player on the A's. On September 11, at 31, he became one of the youngest players to reach the 300-home-run mark (also was his 900th RBI), doing so against the Baltimore Orioles. Colavito hit .274, with 164 hits, 34 home runs, 31 doubles, and 102 RBI for the A's. He also was selected for the All-Star Game. The A's had finished in last place with a 57–105 record.

Return to Cleveland
In January , Colavito was brought back to Cleveland from Kansas City by Indians general manager Gabe Paul, by a three-team trade. The White Sox sent catcher Cam Carreon to Cleveland, and outfielder Mike Hershberger, center fielder Jim Landis, and pitcher Fred Talbot (February) to Kansas City.

During the home opener on April 21, with a crowd of 44,000, Colavito (uniform #21) hit a two-run homer. He hit .287 that season, and placed fifth in the MVP vote after leading the AL in RBI (108) and walks (93). He finished among the league's top five players in home runs (26), hits (170), and runs (92). He also was selected for his eighth All-Star Game. Colavito played in all of Cleveland's 162 games without committing an error (274 chances), but did not win one of the three AL Gold Glove Awards for an outfielder. On September 6, he got his 1,000th RBI. The Indians finished in 5th place with a 87–75 record.

In , Colavito hit .238 with 30 home runs and 72 RBI. He also was selected for his ninth and last All-Star Game. The Indians finished in 5th place with a 81–81 record. Colavito received a $55,000 and $57,000 salary from Cleveland, the highest given to an Indians' team player during those two years.

Chicago White Sox, LA Dodgers, and NY Yankees
In late July , Colavito (hitting .241 with 5 home runs and 21 RBI) was traded by the Indians to the Chicago White Sox, who finished three games out of first that season. In 60 games for the White Sox that season, Colavito managed to get 42 hits with 3 home runs and 29 RBI.

In March , he was purchased by the Los Angeles Dodgers from the White Sox. Colavito hit 3 home runs for the Dodgers in his National League debut, and batted .204 with 23 hits in 60 games. He was released by the Dodgers on July 11 that season.

On July 15, 1968, Colavito was signed as a free agent by the New York Yankees, the last team and season of his 14-year MLB playing career. During his first time up batting for the Yankees, he hit a three-run homer against the Senators. He pitched  scoreless innings as a reliever in the first game of a doubleheader against the league-leading Detroit Tigers. Not only did he face down Al Kaline and Willie Horton, he further vexed the Tigers by scoring the winning run for the Yanks in the eighth inning. He also homered in the second game. Colavito's pitching feat as a Yankee was not seen again in the AL until May 6, 2012, when Baltimore Oriole Chris Davis earned a win. Colavito got 20 hits including 5 home runs in 39 games played for the Yankees. He was released by the Yankees on September 30, 1968 and retired as a player.

Later career
Colavito was hired by the Cleveland Indians as a broadcaster on WJW-TV for the 1972 season. He was a first base coach for the Indians during the 1973 season, broadcaster during the 1975 season, hitting coach and broadcaster during the 1976 season, and first base coach during the 1977 and 1978 seasons. He was a hitting coach for the Kansas City Royals during the 1982 and 1983 seasons.

In 1982, Colavito and Kansas City Royals Manager Dick Howser, a former shortstop for the Indians, were involved in a traffic accident and struggle with police. Colavito and Howser were convicted of interfering with police and received 90-day jail sentences. Both appealed and served six months of probation.

Colavito was involved in the 1983 pine tar game and was ejected for arguing the umpires' decision to negate George Brett's home run and call him out, which would have given the Yankees the win; the decision was later overturned, the game was resumed a month later with the Royals in the lead as the result of Brett's home run, and the Royals won the game.

Personal life
Colavito has been married since 1954. On August 11, 2015, he had to have his right leg amputated below the knee due to problems with Type 2 diabetes, of which he had suffered for a number of years.

MLB stats
Batting stats:

Pitching stats:

Fielding stats:

MLB achievements
Notable achievements:
 6-time AL All-Star (1959, 1961, 1962, 1964, 1965, 1966)
 AL Slugging Percentage Leader (1958)
 2-time AL Total Bases Leader (1959, 1962)
 AL Home Runs Leader (1959)
 AL RBI Leader (1965)
 AL Base on Ball Leader (1965)
 20-Home Run Seasons: 11 (1956–1966)
 30-Home Run Seasons: 7 (1956–1962, 1964, 1966)
 40-Home Run Seasons: 3 (1958, 1959, 1961)
 100 RBI Seasons: 6 (1958, 1959, 1961, 1962, 1964, 1965)
 100 Runs Scored Seasons: 1 (1961)
Other achievements:
 9 All-Star Games (1959-2, 1961–2, 1962–2, 1964, 1965, 1966)
 ML Fielding Percentage Leader as Right Fielder (1965) 
 ML Fielding Percentage Leader as Outfielder (1965)
 Four consecutive home runs in one game (1959) 
 Four home runs in one game (1959)

Legacy
Colavito was one of the most popular power hitters and outfielders of his time with one of the best throwing arms in baseball.

In , Colavito was voted the most memorable personality in Indians history.

In , Colavito received a huge ovation at the introduction of the Indians' All-Century team.

On July 29, 2006, Colavito, along with Ray Chapman, Addie Joss, Sam McDowell, Al Rosen, Herb Score and manager Al López, were all inducted into the Cleveland Indians Hall of Fame.

On August 10, 2021, his 88th birthday, a statue of Colavito was unveiled at Tony Brush Park in Cleveland's Little Italy. Colavito was in attendance for the ceremony.

The Curse of Rocky Colavito
In 1994, Terry Pluto, who covered the Cleveland Indians for The Plain Dealer in the 1980s and became the top sports columnist for the Akron Beacon Journal (but returned to The Plain Dealer in 2007), published The Curse of Rocky Colavito, a book that tried to explain why the Indians had not come within even 11 games of first place since 1959. Pluto's explanation was that the trade of Colavito by the Indians in 1960 sent the team on a path to mediocrity that lasted more than three decades. He also suggested, that the trade in 1965 to bring Colavito back to the Indians was just as bad as the one that had sent him away.

Pluto wrote a sequel, Burying the Curse, in 1995, after the Cleveland Indians won their first American League Championship in 41 years that season. Cleveland lost the World Series 4–2 to the Atlanta Braves. In , the Indians won the AL pennant again, but lost the World Series 4–3 to the Florida Marlins after needing just two more outs in Game 7 to win. In 1999, Pluto wrote the book  Our Tribe, a history of the Cleveland Indians. Pluto insists in the book, that the curse is still in effect.

The Indians' won the American League Championship again 19 years later, in 2016. Cleveland lost the World Series to the Chicago Cubs 4–3; Cleveland's last World Series title was in 1948, when they defeated the Boston Braves.

See also
 List of Major League Baseball career home run leaders
 List of Major League Baseball career runs batted in leaders
 List of Major League Baseball annual runs batted in leaders
 List of Major League Baseball annual home run leaders
 List of Major League Baseball single-game home run leaders
 1961 Detroit Tigers season
List of Major League Baseball single-game hits leaders

References
 Baseball: The Biographical Encyclopedia (2000). Kingston, New York: Total/Sports Illustrated. .

External links

Rocky Colavito at SABR (Baseball BioProject)
Rocky Colavito at Baseball Almanac
Rocky Colavito at Baseballbiography.com
Rocky Colavito at Venezuelan Professional Baseball League
Cleveland Indians Press Release, July 11, 2006 – Indians Hall Of Fame

1933 births
Living people
American League All-Stars
American League home run champions
American League RBI champions
American people of Italian descent
Baseball coaches from New York (state)
Cedar Rapids Indians players
Chicago White Sox players
Cleveland Indians announcers
Cleveland Indians coaches
Cleveland Indians players
Daytona Beach Islanders players
Detroit Tigers players
Indianapolis Indians players
Kansas City Athletics players
Kansas City Royals coaches
Los Angeles Dodgers players
Major League Baseball broadcasters
Major League Baseball hitting coaches
Major League Baseball right fielders
Navegantes del Magallanes players
American expatriate baseball players in Venezuela
New York Yankees players
New York Yankees scouts
Reading Indians players
San Diego Padres (minor league) players
Spartanburg Peaches players
Sportspeople from the Bronx
Baseball players from New York City
American amputees